Henrietta Tabitha Colborne (born 20 April 1998) is an English professional racing cyclist, from Appleby-in-Westmorland, who currently rides for UCI Women's Continental Team .

Major results

2015
 8th London Nocturne
2016
 7th Time trial, UEC European Junior Road Championships
2019
 10th Flanders Ladies Classic
2022
 9th Overall Gracia–Orlová

References

External links
 
 

1998 births
Living people
English female cyclists
People from Appleby-in-Westmorland
Sportspeople from Cumbria